The International Methane Emissions Observatory (IMEO) of the UN Environment Programme is a project which tackles the problem of methane emissions by collecting, integrating, and reconciling methane data from different sources, including scientific measurement studies, satellites, industry reporting through the Oil and Gas Methane Partnership 2.0, and national inventories. It was presented by the United Nations Environment Programme (UNEP) at the G20 Leaders’ Summit in 2021. IMEO creates a public global dataset of empirically verified methane emissions, with an initial focus on fossil fuel sources, and interconnects this data with actions on research, reporting, and regulation.

IMEO serves as an implementing vehicle for the Global Methane Pledge and has the European Commission as one of its founding members.

Methane Emissions 

Methane is an important greenhouse gas, and its atmospheric concentration has nearly tripled since pre-industrial times. It is responsible for about a quarter of current anthropogenic climate warming. Its relatively short atmospheric lifespan – 10 to 12 years – means that reducing methane emissions can yield near-term reductions in the rate of warming, as well as air quality benefits. In its special report in 2019, the Intergovernmental Panel on Climate Change (IPCC) noted that deep reductions in methane emissions must be achieved by 2030 to limit warming to 1.5 or even 2 degrees. Building upon this conclusion, in 2021 the IPCC highlighted in the IPCC 6th Assessment report the important role of methane and other short-lived climate pollutants, recognizing robust evidence that drastic cuts in methane are important for near-term climate benefits, improved air quality, and achieving the Paris Agreement temperature targets. The fossil fuel industry is responsible for an estimated one-third of anthropogenic methane emissions and is the sector with the highest potential for rapid and cost-effective reductions, slowing the rate of warming in the near term even as decarbonisation of the global energy system progresses.

An Eye On Methane 

In October 2021, IMEO published the its first annual report: "An Eye on Methane: International Methane Emissions Observatory 2021 Report". It describes how state actors can take action to curb methane emissions from the fossil fuel industry, and what progress has been made as part of the decarbonization process, particularly in the energy sector. The document provided a framework of action to track and monitor methane emissions to plan mitigation action.

Core Functions 
Core functions are:

1. Integrate methane data from all available sources into a platform, accounting for the confidence of each data element, that improves the characterization of global methane emissions.

2. Collate proprietary asset emissions data through OGMP 2.0, report aggregated company data and verify progress towards announced targets using a range of data sources.

3. Hold companies accountable for their emission performance and encourage companies to increase their performance targets, making rigorous methane emissions management integral to their operational practices.

4. Fund scientific measurement studies to improve the characterization of methane emissions from human activities globally.

5. Evaluate measurement methodologies and technologies to encourage the adoption at scale.

6. Engage countries through capacity building by developing policy-relevant science, strengthening the science policy interface, and deepening the understanding of the climate importance of methane mitigation.

7. Provide early warning services for extraordinary anthropogenic methane emissions.

References 

Methane
United Nations Environment Programme